David Ferrer and Santiago Ventura were the defending champions, but Ferrer did not participate this year.  Ventura partnered with Flávio Saretta, losing in the first round.

José Acasuso and Sebastián Prieto won the title, defeating František Čermák and Leoš Friedl 7–6(7–2), 6–4 in the final.

Seeds

Draw

Draw

References
Draw

Chile Open (tennis)
2006 ATP Tour